The 1999 Little League World Series (LLWS) took place between August 22 and August 28 in Williamsport, Pennsylvania.  The Hirakata Little League of Hirakata, Osaka, Japan, defeated Phenix City National Little League of Phenix City, Alabama, in the championship game of the 53rd LLWS.

Qualification

Pool play

August 22

August 23

August 24

August 25

Elimination round

Champions path
The Hirakata LL reached the LLWS with an undefeated record of four wins and no losses. In total, their record was 9-1, their only loss coming against Juan A. Bablioni LL of Yabucoa, Puerto Rico.

Notable players
Colby Rasmus (Phenix City, Alabama) Major League Baseball (MLB) outfielder
Cory Rasmus (Phenix City, Alabama) MLB pitcher
Michael Saunders (Victoria, British Columbia) MLB outfielder
Lance Lynn (Brownsburg, Indiana) MLB pitcher
Stephen Fife (Boise, Idaho) MLB pitcher

References

External links
1999 official results via Wayback Machine

Little League World Series
Little League World Series
Little League World Series
Little League World Series